Færder  is a municipality in Vestfold in Vestfold og Telemark county, Norway.  The administrative centre of the municipality is the village of Borgheim. The municipality was established in 2018 by the unification of the former municipalities of Tjøme and Nøtterøy.

The  municipality is the 380th largest by area out of the 422 municipalities in Norway. Færder is the 39th most populous municipality in Norway with a population of 26,676.

The Færder National Park, which was established in 2013, comprises islands and sea area east of the municipality.

Government
All municipalities in Norway, including Færder, are responsible for primary education (through 10th grade), outpatient health services, senior citizen services, unemployment and other social services, zoning, economic development, and municipal roads.  The municipality is governed by a municipal council of elected representatives, which in turn elect a mayor.  The municipality falls under the Tønsberg District Court and the Agder Court of Appeal.

Municipal council
The municipal council (Kommunestyre) of Færder is made up of 39 representatives that are elected to four year terms.  Currently, the party breakdown is as follows:

Climate
Færder lighthouse has one of the longest temperature records in Norway, with recording from the same location continuously since 1885. The 1991-2020 base period shows a temperate oceanic climate (Cfb). Færder is known in Norway for warm lows in summer; from the start of recording to summer 2020 Færder recorded 191 nights with lows  or warmer. The all-time high temperature  was recorded July 1955 and August 1947; the all-time low is  recorded in January 1942.

Notable people from Nøtterøy and Tjøme 

 Marcus Jacob Monrad (1816–1897), a philosopher and academic.
 Even Tollefsen (1841–1897), a sea captain and inventor.
 Oscar Albert Johnsen (1876–1954), an historian.
 Bernhard Folkestad (1879–1933), a naturalist painter and essayist, bought a cottage on Brøtsøy.
 Anton Barth von der Lippe (1886–1960), a whaler.
 Leiv Amundsen (1898–1987), a librarian and philologist.
 Lauritz Johnson (1906–1992), a children's writer, radio and TV host, "Uncle Lauritz".
 Helge Skappel (1907–2001), an aviator, photographer and cartographer.
Trygve Bratteli (1910–1984), a politician who served as Prime Minister of Norway from 1971 to 1972 and 1973 to 1976.
 Torgeir Andersen (1916–1991), a politician who was Mayor of Nøtterøy from 1959 to 1969.
 Aasmund Brynildsen (1917–1974), an essayist, biographer and magazine editor.
 Hanna-Marie Weydahl (1922–2016), a pianist.
 Jan P. Syse (1930–1997), a lawyer and politician who served as Prime Minister of Norway from 1989 to 1990.
 Wenche Blomberg (1943–), an author, journalist, and criminologist who was brought up on Tjøme.
 Kjersti Holmen (born 1956–), a TV and film actress.
 Tony Mills (1962–2019), an English rock singer who lived on Tjøme from 2016 until his death.
 Fredrik Kjølner (born 1970–), a footballer with almost 300 club caps.
 Emma Ellingsen (2001–), a transgender model and YouTuber.

References

External links 
 

 
Municipalities of Vestfold og Telemark
2018 establishments in Norway
Populated places established in 2018